Massimo Cialente (born 1 June 1952) is an Italian politician and doctor. He is member of the Democratic Party and was born in L'Aquila, Italy. Cialente is married and has three children.

References

External links 

 
 
 

Living people
1952 births
People from L'Aquila
Democratic Party (Italy) politicians
21st-century Italian politicians
Mayors of places in Abruzzo